Shadia railway station 
() is  located in town of Shadia, Mianwali district, Pakistan.

See also
 List of railway stations in Pakistan
 Pakistan Railways

References

External links

Railway stations in Mianwali District